Sara Rattaro (born Genoa, 9 June 1975) is an Italian writer.

Biography
Sara Rattaro holds degrees in Biology (1999) and Communication Studies (2009), both from the University of Genoa. She worked as a pharmaceutical representative for some years before switching to full-time writing.

Her novels mainly deal with women's lives, feelings and challenges. Spousal abuse, motherhood, family bonds are among the themes she explores in her writing.
She was awarded the Premio Bancarella for Niente è come te in 2015.
She was the recipient of the Rapallo Carige Prize for Splendi più che puoi in 2016.
Her novels have been translated in several languages, among them Spanish, German, Dutch and Russian.
In 2017, her first children's book, Il cacciatore di sogni was published.

Novels
 Sulla sedia sbagliata, Milan: Morellini, 2010
 Un uso qualunque di te, Florence: Giunti, 2012
 Non volare via, Milan: Garzanti Editore 2013
 Niente è come te, Milan: Garzanti Editore 2014
 Splendi più che puoi, Milan: Garzanti Editore 2016
 L'amore addosso, Milan: Sperling & Kupfer, 2017
 Il cacciatore di sogni, Milan: Mondadori, 2017
 Uomini che restano, Milan: Sperling & Kupfer, 2018
 Sentirai parlare di me, Milan: Mondadori, 2019

Awards
 2014 - Premio Città di Rieti
 2015 - Premio Bancarella
 2015 - Premio Rhegium Julii - "Fortunato Seminara" Special Award
 2016 - Rapallo Carige Prize
 2017 - Fenice Europa Prize

References

External links
sararattaro.it (personal website) - Italian
Sara Rattaro on garzantilibri.it - Italian

1975 births
Living people
Italian women novelists
21st-century Italian women writers
21st-century Italian novelists
Writers from Genoa